Queer for Fear: The History of Queer Horror is a 2022 television documentary series from the AMC-owned streaming network Shudder and Steakhaus Productions, executive produced by Bryan Fuller and Steak House.

The series uses interviews with various LGBTQ+ creators to explore LGBTQ+ representation and queer coding in the horror genre throughout history, as well as influences from the Pansy Craze and the Lavender Scare to how 1980s vampire films were influenced by the AIDS epidemic.

The first episode looks at Gothic fiction such as Frankenstein and Dracula and its underlying queer and personal conflict themes; the second considers Pre-Code Hollywood and films made in the early years of the Production Code Administration, especially work by F. W. Murnau, James Whale and Alfred Hitchcock; the third highlights different sub-genres of horror, specifically transformation horror and body replacement; the fourth and final episode discusses the portrayal of lesbians and the predatory female trope.

References

External links 
 Queer for Fear at Shudder
 

2020s American documentary television series
2020s American LGBT-related television series
Shudder (streaming service) original programming